For lists of characters on the CBS Daytime soap opera The Young and the Restless that debuted between 2010 & 2017, please visit the following articles:
The Young and the Restless characters (2010)
The Young and the Restless characters (2011)
The Young and the Restless characters (2012)
The Young and the Restless characters (2013)
The Young and the Restless characters (2014)
The Young and the Restless characters (2015)
The Young and the Restless characters (2016)
The Young and the Restless characters (2017)

See also
The Young and the Restless characters (1970s)
The Young and the Restless characters (1980s)
The Young and the Restless characters (1990s)
The Young and the Restless characters (2000s)

, 2010s